John Francis Dore (December 11, 1881 – April 18, 1938) was an American politician who served as the Mayor of Seattle from 1932 to 1934 and from 1936 to 1938.

References

1881 births
1938 deaths
Mayors of Seattle
Washington (state) Democrats